Dimitrios Christos "Dimitris" Giannoulis (born 17 October 1995) is a Greek professional footballer who plays as a left-back for EFL Championship club Norwich City and the Greece national team. Giannoulis began his senior career with Vataniakos and joining Norwich City in 2021, while having loan spell from PAOK.

Club career

Vataniakos
Starting his youth career at Vataniakos, the left-back graduated to the side’s first-team in 2012, making 33 appearances for the Katerini-based team before signing for PAOK.

PAOK
Giannoulis joined Super League club PAOK in 2014. In his time with PAOK since 2014, Giannoulis has made 74 appearances for the Greek Super League outfit, scoring twice and creating ten assists, even picking up a league title and Greek Cup winners’ medal in the 2018-2019 season.

Loan moves
He spent time on loan at Football League club Pierikos and then at Veria, where his performances earned him the Nova Sports 2015–16 Super League Rookie of the Year award. He then extended his contract with PAOK until 2020. Further loan spells followed, first at Cypriot club Anorthosis, and then back in the Super League with Atromitos, where he was a regular for 18 months.

Return to PAOK
In December 2018, PAOK turned down a €2.2 million offer from French Ligue 1 club Rennes, and recalled the player from loan. He finally made his league debut for PAOK on 10 February 2019 as a second-half substitute against Olympiacos, and made eight appearances in what remained of their 2018–19 season.

Giannoulis scored after 87 minutes of PAOK's 2019–20 Europa League play-off second leg to give his side a 3–2 win on the night, but opponents Slovan Bratislava progressed on away goals after the scores finished 3–3 on aggregate.

Norwich City
In January 2021, Giannoulis was loaned to EFL Championship side Norwich City for the remainder of the season. The left-back was signed after the loan of Xavi Quintillà from Villarreal had been disrupted by injury problems, forcing midfielder Jacob Sorensen into a length stint as cover. The deal included an obligation for Norwich to buy him if they are promoted to the Premier League. The Greece international left-back was then left out of the 2–0 loss at Swansea but started to find his rhythm and show his ability during the 4–1 win over Stoke and the 2–0 victory over Coventry. Giannoulis impressed Norwich City supporters with his performances during the season, getting forward well from his left-back position to help set up several goals as well as defending resolutely. The end of his campaign was also disrupted by a harsh red card bringing a three-game ban, on the day that promotion had been sealed. 

On 17 April 2021, following the club's confirmed promotion to the Premier League, Norwich exercised their obligation to sign Giannoulis on a permanent basis, paying his former club PAOK a fee of €7.5 million. On 11 December 2021, despite the home loss against Manchester United, Giannoulis was voted man of the match for his performance.

International career
On 15 May 2018, Giannoulis was one of nine players to make their Greece national team debuts in a 2–0 friendly loss against Saudi Arabia. He was sent off after 43 minutes of the match.

Personal life
Giannoulis' older brother, Kostas, is also a professional footballer.

Career statistics

Club

Honours
PAOK
Super League Greece: 2018–19
Greek Cup: 2018–19

Norwich City
EFL Championship: 2020–21

Individual
Super League Greece Team of the Year: 2017–18

References

External links
 
 

1995 births
Living people
Footballers from Katerini
Greek footballers
Association football defenders
PAOK FC players
Pierikos F.C. players
Veria F.C. players
Anorthosis Famagusta F.C. players
Atromitos F.C. players
Football League (Greece) players
Super League Greece players
Cypriot First Division players
Greek expatriate footballers
Greek expatriate sportspeople in Cyprus
Expatriate footballers in Cyprus
Greece under-21 international footballers
Greece international footballers
Norwich City F.C. players
English Football League players
Premier League players